Die tödlichen Träume (The Deadly Dreams) is a 1951 German drama film directed by Paul Martin. It is based on several stories by E. T. A. Hoffmann. It was entered into the 1951 Cannes Film Festival.

Cast
 Rudolf Forster as Opitz / E.T.A. Hoffmann / Gefreiter
 Will Quadflieg as Winter / Barravas / Florestan
 Cornell Borchers as Angelika / Inez / Lisette / Maria
 Walter Franck as Alexis / Don d'Alvarez / Cardillac
 Harald Paulsen as Magier / Rodriguez / Olivier

References

External links

1951 films
1951 drama films
1950s fantasy drama films
German fantasy drama films
West German films
1950s German-language films
Films directed by Paul Martin
German black-and-white films
Films based on works by E. T. A. Hoffmann
1950s German films